The year 2017 is the 7th year in the history of the ONE Championship, a mixed martial arts promotion based in Singapore.

List of events

Tournament bracket

Myanmar Flyweight Tournament

ONE Myanmar Flyweight Tournament bracket

1Ye Thway Ne could not participate in the finals of the tournament. He was subsequently replaced by Shwe Kyaung Thar.

ONE Championship: Quest for Power

ONE Championship: Quest for Power (also known as ONE Championship 50) was a mixed martial arts event held by ONE Championship on January 14, 2017 at the  Jakarta Convention Center in Jakarta, Indonesia.

Background
This event featured a world title fight for the ONE Middleweight Championship Vitaly Bigdash of Russia makes the first defense of his title against top contender Aung La Nsang of Myanmar as ONE Championship: Quest for Power headliner.

The co-main event featured a lightweight bout between top contender Martin Nguyen and Kazunori Yokota.

The card was originally headlined by a middleweight title fight between champion Vitaly Bigdash and Marcin Prachnio. However, it was announced Prachnio had to withdraw due to an injury he sustained during  his training camp and Bigdash instead faced Aung La Nsang.

Results

ONE Championship: Throne of Tigers

ONE Championship: Throne of Tigers (also known as ONE Championship 51) was a mixed martial arts event held by ONE Championship on February 14, 2017 at the  Stadium Negara in Kuala Lumpur, Malaysia.

Background

Results

ONE Championship: Warrior Kingdom

ONE Championship: Warrior Kingdom (also known as ONE Championship 52) was a mixed martial arts event held by ONE Championship on March 11, 2017 at the  IMPACT Arena in Bangkok, Thailand.

Background
This event featured a world title fight for the ONE Women's Atomweight Championship Angela Lee of Singapore makes the first defense of her title against top contender Jenny Huang of Taiwan as ONE Championship: Warrior Kingdom headliner. The co-main event featured a lightweight bout between Shannon Wiratchai of Bangkok and Richard Corminal.

In addition MMA action, two of the country's most popular musical acts, Thaitanium and Slot Machine, had performing live at the event.

Results

ONE Championship: Kings of Destiny

ONE Championship: Kings of Destiny (also known as ONE Championship 53) was a mixed martial arts event held by ONE Championship on April 21, 2017 at the  Mall of Asia Arena in Manila, Philippines.

Background
This event featured a world title fight for the ONE Women's Atomweight Championship. Eduard Folayang of the Philippines made the first defense of his title against top contender Ev Ting of Malaysia as ONE Championship: Kings of Destiny headliner.

Rob Lisita has pulled out of the bout against Honorio Banario due to personal reasons and was replaced by Jaroslav Jartim of Czech Republic. A featherweight bout between top featherweight prospect Christian Lee of Singapore and Keanu Subba was originally scheduled for this card, but Keanu Subba suffered an injury during training camp. Lee instead faced Jian Ping Wan.

Results

ONE Championship: Dynasty of Heroes

ONE Championship: Dynasty of Heroes (also known as ONE Championship 54) was a mixed martial arts event held by ONE Championship on May 26, 2017 at the Singapore Indoor Stadium in Kallang, Singapore.

Background
This event featured two world title fight for the ONE Women's Atomweight Championship Angela Lee of Singapore makes the second defense of her title against top contender Istela Nunes of Brazil as ONE Championship: Dynasty of Heroes headliner, for the ONE Welterweight Championship ONE Welterweight World Champion Ben Askren defends his title against rising young Malaysian star Agilan Thani as co-main event.

Also features former ONE strawweight champion Dejdamrong Sor Amnuaysirichoke against indonesian prospect Adrian Matheis.

The event has also featured a 15 minutes submission-only grappling super-match between former ONE Championship lightweight champion Shinya Aoki and multiple time BJJ champion Garry Tonon. If no submissions within the allotted time, match is declared a draw.

Results

ONE Championship: Light of a Nation

ONE Championship: Light of a Nation  (also known as ONE Championship 55) was a mixed martial arts event held by ONE Championship on June 30, 2017 at the Thuwunna National Indoor Stadium in Yangon, Myanmar.

Background

Results

ONE Championship: Conquest of Kings (cancelled)

ONE Championship: Conquest of Kings was cancelled

Background

Results

ONE Championship: Kings and Conquerors

ONE Championship: Kings and Conquerors (also known as ONE Championship 56) was a mixed martial arts event held by ONE Championship on August 5, 2017 at the Cotai Arena in Macau, China.

Background

Results

ONE Championship: Quest for Greatness

ONE Championship: Quest for Greatness (also known as ONE Championship 57) was a mixed martial arts event held by ONE Championship on August 18, 2017 at the Stadium Negara in Kuala Lumpur, Malaysia.

Background

Results

ONE Championship: Shanghai

ONE Championship: Shanghai (also known as ONE Championship 58) was a mixed martial arts event held by ONE Championship on September 2, 2017 at the Shanghai Oriental Sports Center in Shanghai, China.

Background

Results

ONE Championship: Total Victory

ONE Championship: Total Victory (also known as ONE Championship 59) was a mixed martial arts event held by ONE Championship on September 16, 2017 at the Jakarta Convention Center in Jakarta, Indonesia.

Background

Results

ONE Championship: Hero's Dream

ONE Championship: Hero's Dream (also known as ONE Championship 60) was a mixed martial arts event held by ONE Championship on November 3, 2017 at the Thuwunna Stadium in Yangon, Myanmar.

Background

Results

ONE Championship: Legends of the World

ONE Championship: Legends of the World (also known as ONE Championship 61) was a mixed martial arts event held by ONE Championship on November 10, 2017 at the Mall of Asia Arena in Manila, Philippines.

Background

Results

ONE Championship: Immortal Pursuit

ONE Championship: Immortal Pursuit (also known as ONE Championship 62) was a mixed martial arts event held by ONE Championship on November 24, 2017 at the Singapore Indoor Stadium in Kallang, Singapore.

Background

Results

ONE Championship: Warriors of the World

ONE Championship: Warriors of the World (also known as ONE Championship 63) was a mixed martial arts event held by ONE Championship on December 9, 2017 at the Impact Arena, in Bangkok, Thailand.

Results

See also
 2017 in UFC 
 Bellator MMA in 2017
 2017 in Rizin Fighting Federation 
 2017 in Absolute Championship Berkut
 2017 in M-1 Global 
 2017 in Konfrontacja Sztuk Walki 
 2017 in Road FC 
 2017 in Kunlun Fight

References

External links
ONE Championship

ONE Championship events
ONE Championship events
2017 in mixed martial arts
2017 in kickboxing
2017-related lists